Jingyuan County is a county in the east of Gansu Province. It is under the administration of Baiyin City, and consists of two separate tracts of territory to the north and south of Pingchuan District. The northern tract borders Ningxia to the north. The southern area consists of an irrigated area around the Yellow River and the northern area is semi-arid highlands.

The name originated from 'settling down in the borderlands'. Jingyuan belonged to the Yiqu kingdom, later becoming part of the Qin state. The county was first established during the Han dynasty in 114 BC. During the Western Wei it was known as Huizhou (会州),  the defensive outpost of Huining County. It was located at the battleground of the Northern Song Dynasty and the Western Xia. In 1730 the county got its current name. In 1928, Jingyuan was transferred from Shaanxi to Gansu.

Jingyuan has extensive coal reserves, part of the Yaojie Formation, as well as Palygorskite clay reserves of 1 billion tons.

Administrative divisions
Jingyuan County is divided to 13 towns and 5 townships.
Towns

Townships

Climate

Transport 

 G6 Beijing–Lhasa Expressway
 China National Highway 109
 China National Highway 247
 Honghui Railway
 Yinchuan–Lanzhou high-speed railway

See also
 List of administrative divisions of Gansu
 Tai'an Village, Beiwan, Jingyuan

References

External links 

  Official website (Chinese)

 
Jingyuan County
Baiyin